is a point on the Nemuro Peninsula, Nemuro, Japan which is the easternmost point in Hokkaidō. It is also the easternmost point in Japan which is open to the public. It is located where the waters from the Pacific Ocean meet those from the Sea of Okhotsk. The Cape Nosappu Lighthouse is the oldest in Hokkaidō, built in 1872.

The cape is very close to the Habomai Archipelago, which is administered by Russia. The closest island, Signalny Rock, is just 3.7 km away. As such, Russian patrol boats frequently appear on the strait. However, Japan claims the sovereignty over these islands. (See Kuril Islands dispute.) Consequently, the cape houses a lot of monuments dealing with Japanese claims on the territories, such as the House of Nostalgia for the Homeland, the Bridge on the Four Islands, and others.

Gallery

Climate

See also
Extreme points of Japan

References

External links
 Nosappu Lighthouse

Landforms of Hokkaido
Nosappu
Nemuro, Hokkaido